Edward James Kenway is a fictional character in Ubisoft's Assassin's Creed video game franchise. He was introduced as a supporting character in Assassin's Creed: Forsaken, a companion novel to the 2012 video game Assassin's Creed III. He subsequently appeared as the protagonist of the 2013 video game Assassin's Creed IV: Black Flag and its novelization, Assassin's Creed: Black Flag. In the former, he is portrayed by Welsh actor Matt Ryan through performance capture. Since Black Flag's release, the character has made smaller appearances in several other works within the franchise.

Within the series' alternate historical setting, Edward is a Welsh privateer-turned-pirate who is fundamental in establishing a short-lived Pirate Republic in the Caribbean in the early 18th-century. In the process, he becomes caught in the conflict between the Assassin Brotherhood (inspired by the real-life Order of Assassins), who fight for peace and freedom, and the Templar Order (inspired by the Knights Templar military order), who desire peace through control. Initially helping both sides for personal gain, he eventually has a change of heart and formally joins the Assassins after his retirement from piracy. Later in life, he settles down in London, becoming one of the co-leaders of the local branch of the Brotherhood, until his murder by the Templars in 1735. Edward is the father of Haytham Kenway, who would go on to become a high-ranking Templar and the main antagonist of Assassin's Creed III; the grandfather of Ratonhnhaké꞉ton / Connor, Haytham's son with a Native American woman and the protagonist of Assassin's Creed III; and an ancestor of Desmond Miles, the protagonist of the modern-day portions of the first five main games in the series.

Edward has received a positive reception for his charm and characterization as a morally ambiguous protagonist and self-made man, and is considered to be one of the series' most popular characters. Various merchandise for the character, as with other of the series' protagonists, has been released.

Creation and development
Lead scriptwriter for Black Flag Darby McDevitt observed that previous series protagonists have joined the Assassin Brotherhood without much deliberation, often as part of a coming of age moment, as their personal goals are already naturally aligned with that of the organization's. For Black Flag, the developmental team wanted to explore the Assassins' tenets, their "creed", from a new perspective. The idea of a talented and shrewd pirate, a cynical and jaded man who comes into contact with the Assassins, was mooted and proposed as the protagonist who presents this different point of view and who may not share the Assassins' worldview or adherence to a higher purpose or ideal. The whole thrust of the story then became a constant conflict within Edward over the very idea of the Creed, even as he co-opts some of the Assassins' methods and tactics for his personal gain.

McDevitt explained that Black Flag is at its core a story of immorality and repentance, and Edward Kenway is a married man whose strained relationship with his wife is one of the central struggles in the game. McDewitt describe Edward as a "raucous and bawdy chap" who also has a few significant close relationships with other women in the story, and that his primary motivation in Black Flag is to get rich and prove himself a "man of quality' to his family and betters". As for his personality, McDevitt said Edward "is a pirate who yearns for freedom much like the Assassins do, but loathes the sense of responsibility that a truly functional freedom requires" and that the narrative intends to explore "at what point would Edward realize his brand of freedom is too chaotic to function for very long.” McDevitt compared Edward to his grandson Ratonhnhaké꞉ton, better known as Connor, the protagonist of Black Flag's antecedent Assassin's Creed III, and described his character arc as a counterpoint in someway.

Portrayal

Edward Kenway is voiced by Matt Ryan, who also portrayed the character in a motion capture studio. McDevitt admitted that the character and his back story became far more influenced by the culture of Wales than he had originally intended; the developmental team only decided to build their story around a Welsh pirate when they cast Ryan as the voice and image of the character. McDevitt originally envisioned Edward to hail from an English port town like Bristol, Portsmouth, or Manchester, but deliberately left his background blank prior to the finalization of the casting process because he wanted to draw from whichever actor was chosen. McDevitt praised Ryan for the charisma and the personality he brought to the character, but recalled that he initially read his lines in a West County accent. Ryan was then asked to speak in his natural Welsh accent, which ultimately prompted McDevitt to finalize Edward as a Welsh character from Swansea, which matches his actor's cultural background. McDevitt consulted Ryan's father for ideas as he wanted to include some colloquial Welsh phrases into the game's dialogue.

Ryan noted that unlike the majority of the game's cast of characters who are fictionalized versions of historical figures, Edward is an original character. To prepare for the role, Ryan was asked to read books recommended by McDevitt as part of their research of the time period, as the game's developmental team wanted to avoid the usual tropes and archetypes associated with the depiction of piracy in popular fiction.

Fictional character biography
As a Welshman born into a family of farmers in 1693, Edward Kenway is from a low socio-economic background. At some point in his life, he fell in love with a wealthy girl named Caroline Scott. Disobeying the wishes of her parents, Caroline left her comfortable life to marry Edward. Unsatisfied with his wages on the farm, Edward quickly became a drunkard with dreams of becoming rich as a privateer. Caroline lost faith in Edward and left him while concealing her pregnancy. 

Edward left his homeland to search for his fortune, first as a privateer, then as a pirate. He was active in the West Indies from 1712 to 1722 during the later years of the Golden Age of Piracy and was known for his close relationship with the likes of Adéwalé, Blackbeard, Mary Read and Anne Bonny. He commanded the Jackdaw, a brig he had captured from the Spanish treasure fleet in 1715, and inadvertently became involved in the Assassins' and the Templars' search for an ancient place called the Observatory, which Edward intended to use for personal gain. Although Edward's career in piracy was largely a success, helping to establish an independent Pirate Republic in Nassau, he began to reflect on his life after the Republic's collapse in 1718, as well as the deaths of many of his allies. Eventually, he decided to join the Assassin Brotherhood, who sought to preserve peace and the freedom of mankind, and helped them eliminate their Templar rivals and seal away the Observatory.

In 1722, Edward was informed of Caroline's passing two years prior and the existence of his daughter, Jennifer, and arranged to meet the latter. One year later, he retired from piracy for good and relocated to London with Jennifer, donating the Jackdaw to the Assassins. After receiving a pardon from the Prime Minister of Great Britain, Robert Walpole, Edward focused on his responsibilities as an Assassin, eventually making the Brotherhood the dominant force in England and becoming one of its two co-leaders alongside a man named Miko. During this time, Edward used his commercial enterprise as cover to travel the globe in search of more ancient sites like the Observatory. He discovered several temples, including one underneath the ruins of Alamut Castle in the Holy Land, as well as an artifact known as the Shroud of Eden, which he subsequently hid in the Tower of London, until it was re-discovered by Albert, Prince Consort over a century later and relocated to Buckingham Palace.

Through Robert Walpole, Edward was introduced to both Reginald Birch, whom he hired as his assistant, and Tessa Stephenson-Oakley, the daughter of a wealthy landowner, who used her family connections to help Edward buy a mansion in Queen Anne's Square. Edward later married Tessa and had his second child with her: Haytham Kenway. In 1735, Edward discovered that Birch was secretly the Grand Master of the British Templars, but before he could act on this information, he was killed by masked assailants sent by Birch to break into the Kenway Mansion and steal Edward's journal. Following Edward's death, Birch took the young Haytham under his wing and manipulated him into joining the Templars. Although Haytham discovered the truth years later and killed Birch in revenge, he chose to stay a Templar.

Appearances

Assassin's Creed IV: Black Flag
In Assassin's Creed IV: Black Flag, the player experiences Edward's life and exploits in the Caribbean and the west coast of the African continent as part of a simulation played by a silent protagonist who works as a research analyst at Abstergo Entertainment, a corporate front of the Templar Order in the modern era. The plot of Black Flag follows Edward's interactions with fictionalized versions of historical figures who were active during the Golden Age of Piracy, including Stede Bonnet, Woodes Rogers, Laureano de Torres y Ayala, Mary Read, Charles Vane, Jack Rackham, Benjamin Hornigold, Blackbeard, Anne Bonny, and Bartholomew Roberts. In the alternate version of historical events depicted in Black Flag, Edward is personally involved with several notable incidents that occurred during the time period, including the founding of the Republic of Pirates at Nassau on New Providence island, Blackbeard's blockade of Charles Town in May 1718, the Battle of Ocracoke Inlet on November 22, 1718, and the trial of Read and Bonny at Port Royal on November 16, 1720.

After learning about a mysterious location known as the Observatory, which he erroneously believes as housing treasure that would set him up financially for life, Edward is determined to secure access at any cost. He actively avoids choosing a side permanently, and is willing to utilize opportunities from both the Templars and the Assassins to achieve his goal. He begins to have a change of heart following the death of Read, who had consistently appealed to Edward's conscience throughout their friendship, and permanently sides with the Assassins towards the end of his piracy career. In the ending of Black Flag, he is reunited with Jennifer, a daughter he never knew he had and who would insist on using her mother's surname Scott as an adult.

Other appearances
Edward's legacy and his mansion serve as a plot point in the 2015 game Assassin's Creed Syndicate, in which the protagonists search for the Shroud of Eden that Edward had found during his travels. He is also featured in Dead Men's Gold, a story arc from the 2018 mobile spin-off game Assassin's Creed: Rebellion, which serves as a prequel to the introduction sequence of Black Flag. Like other series protagonists, Edward's outfit has been an unlockable cosmetic option in most subsequent releases, including the remastered version of Assassin's Creed III released in 2019.

The character has also been featured extensively in Assassin's Creed expanded media, with his first appearance in the franchise being in the 2012 novel Assassin's Creed: Forsaken by Oliver Bowden, which follows Edward's son, Haytham Kenway. The novel is presented as Haytham's journal, which recounts the events leading to Edward's eventual fate, and serves to bridge the narrative gap between Black Flag and Assassin's Creed III. He is also the central focus of Assassin's Creed: Black Flag, the novelization of the 2013 video game, also authored by Bowden, and Assassin's Creed: Awakening, a non-canonical manga adaptation of the game, written by Takashi Yano and illustrated by Kenji Oiwa. In 2017, Edward appeared in the third issue of the Assassin's Creed: Reflections comic book miniseries, which recounts his final adventure in the Caribbean prior to settling down in England, and his encounter with infamous pirate Edward "Ned" Low. 

Outside the Assassin's Creed series, Edward has been referenced in the 2020 game Watch Dogs: Legion, where a statue of the character can be found in an underground Assassin Tomb in London, as part of a non-canonical crossover between the Assassin's Creed and Watch Dogs franchises.

Promotion and merchandise
In conjunction with Ubisoft, Todd McFarlane and his McFarlane Toys Design Group designed a highly detailed, hand-painted, and cold-cast resin limited-edition statue of Edward Kenway. Only one thousand pieces were created and distributed worldwide, and each statue includes a Certificate of Authenticity hand-signed by McFarlane.

Reception

Edward Kenway has been well received by video game journalists, with high placements on several "top character" ranking lists of Assassin's Creed series protagonists. VideoGamer.com ranked him among the best pirates in video games.

Matt Purslow from IGN described Edward as the "true secret weapon" of Black Flag, the central element that binds the game's disparate elements and features together, and argued that it manages to avoid the pitfalls of over-reliance on MacGuffin plot devices like its predecessors due to the narrative focus on Edward’s personal journey. He found the character's privateer-turned-pirate background, a chancer looking for profit whose decision to steal the robes of a member of the Assassins sparks his growth from rebel to honorable captain, to be a "fresh perspective to the overarching narrative of the series". Andrei Dobra from Softpedia interpreted McDevitt's statements about Edward in an interview with VG247 as indicative of a belief that the popularity of Black Flag is largely because the character is an unusual protagonist who trumps many established tropes concerning heroes in the franchise. In an article which offers an impression of Assassin's Creed: Valhalla Jordan Ramée from GameSpot reflected on his gameplay experience with Edward in Black Flag fondly, where combat sequences often involved head-on confrontation of foes and that Edward solves many of his problems as a pirate that's making the most of the tools of an Assassin. Evan Stallworth Carr from The Daily Californian found Edward Kenway to be "a deeply interesting character" who displays a "charismatic and outgoing personality" for his pirate persona. On the other hand, Carr opined that he does not fit well into the lore of the series, which in his view ultimately hurt the plot of Black Flag. Stephen Totilo was of the opinion that while the subplot involving the wife he left behind paid off beautifully at its conclusion, Edward is a "forgettable lead" and his character arc is "shallow".

The ending sequence of Black Flag has attracted praise for its depiction of Edward's character development. Tom Phillips from Eurogamer found it to be a "surprisingly mature conclusion for a series all about stabbing people in the neck", as Kenway finally gives up a life of piracy to settle down with his newly-discovered daughter, and that it took the entirety of the narrative of Black Flag where his experiences of the deaths of all of his close friends and loved ones lead him to making a sensible decision about his life. Erik Kain from Forbes found the final moments of Black Flag to be "surprisingly beautiful", describing the finale as an "oddly sad and redemptive" contemplation of the character's loss which segues to his conversation with his daughter which is both playful and regretful in tone.

Analysis
Nick Dinicola from Pop Matters found the narrative approach by Black Flag to be interesting, as its lead character does not become an official member of the Brotherhood of Assassins by the ending of the game; instead, the story explores both sides of the long-running Assassin-Templar conflict from the perspective of an indifferent protagonist, and allows players a better sense of the Assassins' code of conduct as Edward gradually becomes sympathetic to their cause and acknowledges that their creed is “the beginning of wisdom.” In his paper which examines the representation of female characters in the Assassin’s Creed Series published by St. Mary’s University of Minnesota, Stephen J. Fishburne described Edward Kenway as "capturing the ideal of masculinity and the self-made man to the greatest extent" amongst other male protagonists in the series, and noted that "the consequences of his irresponsibility are really only felt by those around him" because he is still considered the "hero of Black Flag". In a paper which analyzes the cultural depiction of piracy in video games, Eugen Pfister said the depiction of pirates as rebels but not revolutionaries in Black Flag is historically accurate. Pfister noted that while Edward mostly acts ethically and adheres to his own code of conduct as he tries to do the “right thing”, he becomes a “gentleman of fortune” of his own volition in the first place, and that even more importantly, he seeks no redemption for his violent actions when it comes to exploring and hunting for victims. This is reinforced by the game's mechanics, which encourages constant pillaging and raiding of merchant ships to improve the performance of Edward's flagship and offers the character "no incentive to ponder the possibility of becoming an honest man again".

References

External links

Assassin's Creed characters
Fictional blade and dart throwers
Fictional British people in video games
Fictional criminals in video games
Fictional explorers in video games
Fictional knife-fighters
Fictional rope fighters
Fictional murdered people
Fictional people from the 18th-century
Fictional sea pirates
Fictional privateers
Fictional pirates in video games
Fictional prison escapees
Fictional sea captains
Fictional swordfighters in video games
Fictional gunfighters in video games
Fictional traceurs and freerunners
Fictional Welsh people
Male characters in video games
Video game characters introduced in 2012
Fictional musketeers and pistoleers
Fictional nobility